Dalbergia annamensis is a species of legume in the family Fabaceae.
It is found only in Vietnam.
It is threatened by habitat loss and agent orange.

References

Sources

annamensis
Endemic flora of Vietnam
Trees of Vietnam
Taxonomy articles created by Polbot